Kerry Blackshear may refer to:

 Kerry Blackshear Sr. (born 1973), American former professional basketball player
 Kerry Blackshear Jr. (born 1997), American professional basketball player